The fifth and final season of the American television series Person of Interest premiered on May 3, 2016. The season is produced by Kilter Films, Bad Robot Productions, and Warner Bros. Television, with Jonathan Nolan, Greg Plageman, J. J. Abrams, Bryan Burk, Chris Fisher and Denise Thé serving as executive producers and Nolan and Plageman serving as showrunners. 

The series was renewed for a fifth season in May 2015. In March 2016, it was reported that the season would be the final season of the series. The season stars Jim Caviezel, Kevin Chapman, Amy Acker, Sarah Shahi and Michael Emerson. The series revolves around a team led by a mysterious reclusive billionaire computer programmer, Harold Finch, who has developed a computer program for the federal government known as "the Machine" that is capable of collating all sources of information to predict terrorist acts and to identify people planning them, as well as detecting all lesser crimes, known as "irrelevant" crimes. The season revolves around the team's last fight against Samaritan, a mass surveillance system that aims to destroy the Machine.

The season premiered on May 3, 2016 on CBS and ended on June 21, 2016. Viewership for the season averaged 6.14 million viewers, making it the least watched season of the series. The season received acclaim from critics and audiences, with the writing, performances, directing, and emotional tone receiving praise. The series finale, "return 0", received universal acclaim from critics and audience.

Season summary
The Machine is reinstated onto a makeshift network of computers in hiding, but takes some time before it works reliably again due to damage sustained from power failures while it was in storage. At a Samaritan facility, advanced VR technology is used on a captured Shaw to run thousands of neural simulations in order to get her to reveal the Machine's location. During these simulations, Shaw is made to believe that an implant had been placed in her brain stem and that it was influencing her actions. She later escapes, but is unsure whether the escape itself is just another simulation. 

Samaritan engineers a lethal infection in order to force people to provide their DNA during vaccination, which will be used to decide who will be allowed to live. Root pleads with Finch to allow the Machine to be more proactive, in its fight against Samaritan, but Finch refuses, fearing the result of an uninhibited superintelligence, even of his own making. Finch is captured by Samaritan operatives, and Root is killed during her escape. Finch is taken into custody for treason, where he delivers a soliloquy via CCTV to Samaritan, in which he describes his struggle with long-held pacifist beliefs, due to the greater risk posed by Samaritan. Finch relents and asks the Machine to help him directly; it chooses Root's voice as its own, and helps him escape. It admits that in watching people, it has learned to love and understand people, and had grieved for those lost.

Finch steals and weaponizes ICE-9, a virulent computer virus capable of infecting and destroying Samaritan, although it will also destroy the Machine and much of the global computing infrastructure as well. On the verge of ICE-9's activation, Greer sacrifices himself in vain to kill Finch and ensure Samaritan's continuation, and Samaritan tries to argue that Finch must change his mind and consider the consequences of his actions, but Finch responds that he has indeed considered them; he activates ICE-9 within the NSA and to all systems the NSA is capable of reaching, as well as breaching the Federal Reserve to destroy Samaritan's backup with the same virus. 

A final copy of Samaritan, uploaded as a last resort onto an orbiting satellite, is destroyed when Reese sacrifices himself to save Finch and uploads a copy of the Machine there to directly fight Samaritan. The Machine also falls victim to ICE-9 and ceases to function after showing Finch its prediction of the world and his friends' futures if it had not existed - Samaritan would have arisen anyway, but without means of restraint. Finch survives and reunites with his former fiancée. A while later, Shaw is unexpectedly contacted by the Machine; it has restored itself from the satellite back to a land-based computer, to continue its work.

Cast and characters

Main
 Jim Caviezel as John Reese
 Kevin Chapman as Lionel Fusco
 Amy Acker as Samantha Groves/Root
 Sarah Shahi as Sameen Shaw
 Michael Emerson as Harold Finch

Recurring 
 Josh Close as Jeffrey Blackwell
 Enrico Colantoni as Carl Elias
 John Nolan as John Greer
 Julian Ovenden as Jeremy Lambert
 David Aaron Baker as Martin LeRoux
 John Doman as Ron Garrison
 LaChanze as Mona
 James Le Gros as Bruce Moran
 Robert Manning, Jr. as Zachary
 James Carpinello as Joey Durban
 Brett Cullen as Nathan Ingram
 Ned Eisenberg as Joseph Soriano
 Oakes Fegley as Gabriel Hayward
 Annie Ilonzeh as Harper Rose
 Michael McGlone as Bill Szymanski
 Ebon Moss-Bachrach as Michael Cole
 Annie Parisse as Kara Stanton
 Jacob Pitts as Henry Peck
 Michael Potts as Travers
 Carrie Preston as Grace Hendricks
 Wrenn Schmidt as Dr. Iris Campbell
 Jimmi Simpson as Logan Pierce

Notable guests
 Keith David as Terence Beale
 Stephen Plunkett as Alex Duncan
 James Riordan as Dr. Aaron Wendell
 Will Connolly as Ethan Garvin
 Christina Bennett Lind as Karen Turner
 Purva Bedi as Maggie
 Scott Adsit as Max Greene
 Jenna Stern as Dr. Mason
 Neal Huff as Terry Easton
 Geoff Pierson as Agent Roberts

Episodes

Production

Development
The series was renewed for a fifth season in May 2015. In contrast to the previous seasons getting renewed in March, the decision to delay the renewal until May was due to the declining ratings of the second half of the fourth season, with the season finale hitting a new series low. On the very same day of the renewal, it was announced that CBS only ordered 13 episodes for the season. This prompted many analysts to question whether the season would be the final season, to which Nina Tassler, President and Chairwoman of CBS, commented, "We're having those conversations with the team right now. Jonah Nolan and Greg Plageman came in and pitched really terrific ideas for the new season. It's always been a really smart, creative show. If it is the final season, then we'll have a great ending."

While promoting the season at the 2015 San Diego Comic-Con, series creator Jonathan Nolan said, "We're going to make 13 kickass episodes, and drop the microphone. I can't predict down the road but we're very proud of the show and if it's the last season, no one is going to be disappointed with the story we tell." Executive producer Greg Plageman said that the season finale could work as a series finale and he had the final scenes planned in advanced, although he said the writers still had more stories left to tell. In August 2015, Michael Emerson explained how they approached the season, "I think because we're thinking of this like an ending — although I'm guessing it will be ambiguous enough to be pursued later on — it's an ending. Splashy endings usually involve casualties. So I think we're likely to either lose characters or have them somehow transformed." Co-star Jim Caviezel also expressed doubt on the final season announcement. In the same month, CBS still wasn't confirming the series' final season. Tassler said, "We haven't determined if it's the end of the series yet. We don't know those dates. We're not anywhere near having to determine what that last storyline will be." In November 2015, TVLine deemed that the series was in danger of cancellation, citing the limited series order and delayed schedule for the season.

In November 2015, the cast and crew celebrated a party for reaching 100 episodes. Michael Emerson commented on the series' trajectory, "When you start out with a show, you think of it as, 'OK, this is a pilot. It's a job. I don't think you really have an expectation of it going'. Actors, we just train ourselves over the years not to hope too much. So when it does actually go, you think, 'Oh my God. I'm going to have to really do this. I'm going to have to do it a lot. One hundred episodes, possibly. Hahahaha!' It doesn't seem real."

In January 2016, Greg Geller, the new President of CBS, said no decision was made yet. In the same month, executive producer J. J. Abrams said he thought this would be the final season, "My guess is this is the final season. The only heartbreak there is how much good story there was to come if it were to have continued. But Jonah Nolan and Greg Plageman I think have done such an amazing job on that show and I know what these episodes are that they've done wrapping it up. We don't yet have a schedule, but they will see the light of day. People will get to see these episodes and I know the power of that story. To have a show go as many years as that has, it's very hard to complain. It's a miracle to get a show on the air and to have it last that long is something that we should just be grateful for. But I do love that show and I would love to have seen it continue." Abrams also said that even though they had no confirmation, the season finale could work as a proper series finale.

In March 2016, CBS officially announced that the fifth season would be the series' last season. Nolan and Plageman released a statement saying, "We're extremely excited to be able share this final season with the fans. We're eternally grateful to our amazing cast and crew, as well as our partners at the studio and network. Most of all, we want to thank the show's fans — the best fans in the world. This subversive little paranoia-inducing cyberpunk-thriller is for you and would not have been possible without your support. As life has come to imitate Person of Interest, it's been our great privilege to work on show for the past five seasons. We can't wait for you to experience this thrilling and final chapter."

Series creator Nolan commented on the final season, explaining that despite being announced as the final one, they brought closure to the show, "It became abundantly clear to us that we were a part of a business model that did not work for the network anymore, despite loyal fans and the better part of 10 million people watching every week. We read the writing on the wall. We're in a very fortunate position to be able to write the end of the show, and write it in a way that it's not the very end of the story. I think with this many characters and a world as big as the one that we created with the show, you never say never. But we wanted to definitively end this chapter, this version of the show." Emerson also talked about the season, saying, "We had to hurry up and end it. They had 13 episodes to turn a very large, slow-moving boat. But I think the idea that we had to do it in 13 was actually a plus rather than a minus. I think it allowed the writers' room to set aside their need to create palatable side stories or a murder-of-the-week or whatever, and really just get focused on wrapping up the loose ends of this thing."

Executive producer Greg Plageman mentioned that despite the late announcement, the ending was exactly as they envisioned it, "It seemed to spring organically from the sacrificial nature of what Reese was doing. It felt right in terms of that relationship from the very beginning." Regarding the idea of a sequel series, Plageman said "I would say never say never in a world where we've seen the X-Files and 24 and a number of really strong premises come back as well." Nolan also debunked rumors that "Synecdoche" could serve as a spin-off, "We didn't want to do a spinoff. We've watched friends go through this where it’s like, the series is doing great, spin it off and then you wind up impoverishing both shows."

Writing

Michael Emerson previewed the Machine's role in the season, "If Finch has to rebuild it, he may not do it the way he did it initially. He may give it more of the freedom that Root was always demanding for it. And maybe the new Machine is a greater warrior than the old Machine was." He also talked about Finch's new partnership with Root, "people that keep saving your life and stuff, you tend to warm to them. The question will be, can she prevail on him if they do indeed collaborate on the rebooting of the Machine. What aspects of her character will the Machine end up with?" Nolan also commented, "What's great fun about the early episodes is watching the two of them argue about, if they can adjust The Machine's secret formula, should they? Given that the stakes are higher and time is running out for them, what are the ethics in changing your strategy?" Plageman said, "Our guys are under duress. The Machine is in a suitcase and it's becomes a fight for survival at this point. And then they have to try to figure out whether we can reconstitute The Machine."

Commenting on Shaw's return, Amy Acker said, "Shaw has been gone and when she comes back, we don't know one hundred percent if she's trustworthy. I'm definitely on the side that Shaw can do no wrong, and even if something had happened, I think Root feels like their relationship is strong enough that she has the power to turn her back. It's going to be an interesting struggle." Jim Caviezel said, "There's a big wariness with Reese because is she going to disrupt the team? Is the Samaritan going to sink its claws into our minds? Is she a Manchurian candidate?" Kevin Chapman also commented, "Fusco has always carried a fondness for Shaw for the simple fact that she saved his son's life in Season 3. That's a bond you're never going to break." Executive producer Denise Thé said, "Shaw has always been the one that doesn't experience emotions the same way that every other person does. Her emotions have always been dimmed. So to awaken those in her, you have to have pretty strong chemistry."

For the 100th episode, "The Day the World Went Away", Nolan called the episode, "a celebration of all of the things the show has done over the years. Which is to say, we present some provocative ideas, blow up a lot of s–t, and really piss off a lot of fans by killing off a couple of major characters." He also teased the action, "I've been dreaming about that action sequence for about five years. Waiting for the right moment to toss it in there. The sniper-through-the-sun roof, cruise control, steer-the-car-with-your-four-inch-heeled boot maneuver is something that Root was destined for for an awfully long time." The episode featured the death of Samantha "Root" Groves, played by Amy Acker since the first season. Nolan explained that her arc was planned since the second season and when they started working on the fifth season, he questioned "Look, this is the plan we had in mind. Do we really want to go this way?" They decided to incorporate the story after deciding at the beginning of production that the season would be its last. He also viewed the Machine's development, "It's not a cop-out, it's an evolution of a character, a Machine that has been, for five seasons, casting about looking for a voice for an avatar, and has settled, for three seasons now, on Root as its analog interface. Well, this is the ultimate evolution of that." Regarding the Machine's use of Root's voice, executive producer Greg Plageman said, "I feel like the Machine was Root's first love, in some ways, and the way she went out, protecting the father of the Machine and understanding the ultimate import of this in the world, is perfect. It's perfect." Talking about Finch's subsequent interrogation scene, Plageman added "We have to give that character license to and why and what does it mean? He's carried this tremendous baggage. The loss of so many people close to him - Nathan Ingram, pushing away Grace. Everyone close to him who's lost someone, it becomes a tipping point in the 100th episode. And to see that turn -- Michael Emerson is thrilling." 

Amy Acker commented on her character's fate, explaining "It was really sad. I didn't quite know what the involvement was going to be necessarily when I became the voice of the Machine, but it actually ended up -- I was crying, 'I'm so sad to leave!', thinking I wasn't going to see everyone. And then the way that it worked out with the last three episodes, they were like, 'You're back!'" She also added, "Root's first love was The Machine and brought her into the world of all of these people to begin with. That's the great thing about Person of Interest. It's never been about sexuality. It's always just been about doing what you have to do for the people you love or for the things you love. I think this is another example of Root doing what she had to do to save all these people who she loves in her mind."

Nolan also previewed the series finale, "return 0", saying "There have been points along the way where we've adapted, changed course, incorporated new things — Shaw was a character that we hadn't fully conceived of when we started the show — but this is the end that we always talked about, the end that's indicated in the pilot." He further added, "we limp into the finale with some of our team intact. And some of them make it out. It's a bit of a bloodbath. It's delicious fun watching the final confrontation between these two titans: Samaritan and the Machine, and all of the folks who work for them. That kind of cataclysm of how do you stop an unstoppable force? And the answer is, through a great deal of sacrifice." He also added, "I don't think I've ever written a happy ending. We're not keen on happy endings here. Way back in the pilot, Finch promised that 'this will end messily for all of them' and I think we fulfilled the mandate." Emerson also talked about the finale, saying "The ending, I thought, was really satisfying - and still ever so slightly open-ended, so that if someone, someday wanted to reboot this thing, or have a Chapter 2 of some sort, it wouldn't be out of the question. There are survivors... but not many." He also added, "I didn't know how they would wrap it up. I didn't feel the end coming, though I could feel the stakes rising. When I could finally see the end, I thought, 'oh my god, they're doing that'. The narrative dictates its own end. They honored the five years and their viewer's expectations."

The series finale featured Reese's death, which was written before the season was announced as the last one, with Nolan saying, "this relationship between Reese and Finch, from the beginning, has been so beautiful to write, and it's a slow burn, with these two great actors, this kind of odd couple. And what Finch has given to Reese and what Reese has tried to give back in return, is very moving to me. And the opportunity for Reese to repay that, as he says in the beginning of the episode, pay it back all at once, for me and for Greg I think, was just the most moving version of how this story ended. And yeah, it would just be bulls**t if they all made it out intact. What they've been doing is fighting against impossible odds. It would rob the ending of all meaning if it was happy endings all around." Nolan also commented, "You almost knew at some point in time that sort of sacrifice was going to be required in order for them to ultimately defeat Samaritan and for one to allow the other to go on. You get a sense that these guys are on a tragic journey - we announced it right from the pilot that they are not both going to make it." Nolan explained the decision to use Root as the Machine's form, "If the journey of the whole series had been from the Machine as a notion to a thing, a person, an intelligence, you really wanted to crystalize that. You really wanted to bring that moment to the fore. So there's no better actor to present that and no better character on our show, potentially with the exception of Finch himself, which I guess is another way the narrative could have gone, than Amy Acker, to have someone to convey all that complexity and all those multitudes contained within the Machine."

Casting
In July 2015, executive producer Denise Thé teased the return of Shaw to the series, saying "You haven't seen the last of Shaw." In August 2015, Sarah Shahi confirmed her return to the series, stating she would appear in 8 or 9 episodes of the season. She said she would return and start filming in September but stated she had no idea about her character's storyline.

In August 2015, Keith David was announced to guest star as Terence Beale, "a smart and cunning CIA supervisory agent" and described as "the kind of guy who knows where the bodies are buried... mostly because he put a few of them there himself." In January 2015, Josh Close joined in a mysterious recurring role, which Plageman described as a "very interesting character — in what is poised to be the series' strongest season to date." In January 2015, Carrie Preston was confirmed to return to the series as Grace Hendricks, Finch's ex-fiancée.

Release

Broadcast
In May 2015, CBS revealed its 2015-16 television schedule for fall, but the series was omitted from the fall schedule, being held as a mid-season replacement. In November 2015, CBS announced its midseason schedule, which covered January to April, but the series was absent in the schedule. In January, CBS stated that the series would premiere on spring.

In March 2016, the same day when they made the final season announcement, CBS confirmed that the season would premiere on May 3, 2016. The announcement also revealed that the series would air multiple episodes per week, constantly airing on Mondays and Tuesdays. The series ended on June 21, 2016.

Marketing
On July 11, 2015, the cast and crew attended the 2015 San Diego Comic-Con to discuss and promote the season and revealing a sizzle reel for the season. During the panel, a special first look for Westworld, Nolan's new series, was screened as a surprise to the audience. On October 10, 2015, the cast attended the 2015 New York Comic-Con. At the panel, they revealed the first trailer for the season, using footage from "SNAFU", where the Machine's facial recognition system malfunctions. A new trailer was revealed in April 2016, advertising the season as the last season.

Home media release
The fourth season was released on Blu-ray and DVD in region 1 on July 19, 2016, in region 2 on September 11, 2017, and in region 4 on February 1, 2017.

In 2014, Warner Bros. Television Studios announced that it sold the off-network SVOD of the series to Netflix. On September 22, 2020, the series left Netflix and was added to HBO Max on January 23, 2021.

Reception

Viewers

Critical reception
The fifth season received critical acclaim. On Rotten Tomatoes, the season has an approval rating of 100% and average rating of 8.74 out of 10 based on 14 reviews. The site's critical consensus is, "Person of Interest concludes in a satisfying fifth season that both deepens the characters that audiences have grown to love and delivers a cracking arc about the dangers of technology."

Matt Fowler of IGN gave the season an "amazing" 9.5 out of 10 and wrote in his verdict, "Person of Interests final season was a magnificent display of heart and smarts. It was a thrilling, intelligent action adventure that stabbed wickedly at the heart of the artificial intelligence debate, and provided one of the best series finales of all time." Alan Sepinwall of Uproxx wrote, "On the whole, 'return 0' was an incredibly satisfying end to the story, and not just because it fulfilled Chekhov's famous rule about how if you introduce a decommissioned subway car in season 4, your characters must actually ride on it by the end of season 5. I'm glad I finally caught up, and glad I got to watch most of the final season in real time. This was a treat." 

Chancellor Agard of Entertainment Weekly wrote, "There are many reasons to miss Person of Interest. It was great sci-fi in the sense that its world was only a few steps away from our present and commenting on it. Throughout its run, Person of Interest figured out how to juggle procedural and serialized storytelling pretty well (season 3 is a high point) and created strong and moving relationships at the same time. As the show makes clear, it may be ending, but it's not over, and these characters live on." Emily St. James of Vox wrote, "When Person of Interest debuted, the series was written off as slightly cold, as a techno-thriller that lacked anything human to it. As the series went on, it became ever more clear that it had that chilly feeling because so many of its characters were, themselves, machines, made that way by an increasingly impersonal society. And yet here, in the middle of all that, is one of the best love stories on TV. The implication is clear: If we survive the coming AI war, it won't be because we've placated either superintelligence; it will be because we've remembered what makes us human in the first place."

Writing on io9, Katharine Trendacosta noted that by the end of the series in 2016, Person of Interest had been transformed from a "crime-fighting show" with an entertaining plot device into "one of the best science-fiction series ever broadcast".

Accolades

References

External links 
 

Person of Interest seasons
2016 American television seasons